Chiasso railway station is a station owned by the Swiss Federal Railways (SBB CFF FFS). It serves the town of Chiasso, in the canton of Ticino, Switzerland, and is also a border station between Switzerland and Italy.

The station is both the southern terminus of the Gotthard railway (owned and operated by SBB CFF FFS), and the northern terminus of the Milan–Chiasso railway (owned by Rete Ferroviaria Italiana and operated by Trenitalia). It is situated a few metres from the border, with the eastern section of Platform 1 being located on Italian territory, and is separated from the Italian city of Como by twin railway tunnels through the Monte Olimpino.

Train movements
Given its location, Chiasso is an important station, not only for the connection between Italy and Switzerland, but also for that between northern and southern Europe. The station is served by the long-distance trains that cross the Gotthard, together with S10 and S40 of the Ticino regional network, and line S11 of the Milan suburban service.

In 2009, there was a reduction in the numbers of train services to the station, which led to the reduction in the numbers of certain jobs. Thanks to numerous complaints raised by various sectors of the political and institutional elements of Ticino, Swiss-Italian EuroCity services returned to Chiasso.

 the following services stop at Chiasso:

 EuroCity: 

Border procedures
As the international border station, Chiasso acts as a transmission facility between the two networks.  The traction voltages, motors and signalling systems of the two networks are different, and therefore trains passing through the station must change locomotives.  The yard tracks are also required to be divided into two parts, connected to the station's central platform by a corridor, where there are also customs offices. Thus, trains for the Italian network start at separate tracks compared to the Swiss network.

With the entry of Switzerland into the Schengen Agreement, passport controls have officially been abolished. However, in practice, the Italian Guardia di Finanza and the Swiss Border Guard may still perform border checks on selected trains, both in Chiasso station and aboard trains.

Customs
Chiasso remains, for customs purposes, a border station for passengers arriving from Italy. Customs checks may be performed in the station by Swiss officials.

References

Further reading

External links 

Railway stations in Switzerland opened in 1874
Railway stations in Ticino
Chiasso
Swiss Federal Railways stations
Milan S Lines stations
Neoclassical architecture in Switzerland